Justice Shiranee Tilakawardane was a sitting Justice of the Supreme Court of Sri Lanka and member of the Judicial Service Commission. She has also served as acting Chief Justice for when Mohan Peiris was out of the country.

Education
Justice Tilakawardane was educated at Bishop's College, Colombo and went on to study law at the Sri Lanka Law College. Her legal career commenced with apprenticeship under Lalith Athulathmudali PC. This was followed by a tenure in the United States, where she served in the Consumer and Narcotic Division of the District Attorney's Office of Fort Colorado.
She received an honorary degree from Williams College in June 2007 and an honorary degree from Smith College in May 2011.

Pioneer
Justice Tilakawardane represented an early generation of women lawyers in Sri Lanka and scored many firsts. She became the first woman to be enrolled as a State Counsel in 1978.  She further established a record by being the country's first female judge of the High Court in April 1988 and became the first woman Justice of the Court of Appeal of Sri Lanka in July 1998.  She went on to become President of the Court of Appeals. Justice Tilakawardane's work in the fields of equality and justice, gender education, and child rights in Sri Lanka and the international community have earned her international recognition. She participated in drafting the guidelines for child victim and child witness testimony submitted to the UN for adoption in the International Criminal Court, in addition to many other writings and presentations on child abuse and child witnesses for organizations including the International Bureau of Child Rights and the Child Protection Authority. She has been active in Sakshi of India's gender workshops for judges and the Asia Pacific Forum for Gender Education for Judges, and serves on the International Panel of Judges for the Child Rights Bureau. She also serves as an International Advisory Board member for the International Center for Ethics, Justice and Public Life of Brandeis University in the U.S. She is currently a consultant to the Sri Lanka Judges Training Institute.

References

Puisne Justices of the Supreme Court of Sri Lanka
Alumni of Sri Lanka Law College
Living people
21st-century Sri Lankan people
Sri Lankan women judges
High Courts of Sri Lanka judges
Sinhalese judges
Court of Appeal of Sri Lanka judges
Presidents of the Court of Appeal of Sri Lanka
Year of birth missing (living people)